Mount George V is a mountain located in Strathcona Provincial Park on Vancouver Island in British Columbia. Mount Frink and Castlecrag Mountain are within  to the northeast. Its first ascent may have been by surveyors in the 1930s.

The mountain was named in 1935 for George V in recognition of his Silver jubilee.

References

Sources

External links
Strathcona Provincial Park from British Columbia Ministry of Environment website.

Silver Jubilee of George V
One-thousanders of British Columbia
Vancouver Island Ranges
Comox Land District